Cabbie may refer to:

 Taxicab driver
 The Cabbie, a 2000 Taiwanese film
 Lee Mroszak, a.k.a. Crazy Cabbie, deejay and former regular guest on The Howard Stern Show
 Cabbie Richards, Canadian TV personality
 London Cabbie or Cabbie, a board game